Vinay Kumar Sinha (also written as Vinay Sinha ;  – 24 January 2020) was an Indian producer. He was the vice president of Indian Motion Picture Producers' Association.

Biography
Sinha was the producer of Chor Police which was released in 1983. Amjad Khan made his directorial debut with this film. He also produced Andaz Apna Apna. This film received a cult classic status among the Hindi film audiences. Besides these films he also produced films like Ameer Aadmi Gharib Aadmi and Naseeb. He also produced a few television shows.

Sinha died on 24 January 2020 at the age of 74.

Selected filmography
 Chor Police (1983)
 Ameer Aadmi Gharib Aadmi (1985)
 Andaz Apna Apna (1994)
 Naseeb (1997)

References

External links
 

Place of birth missing
1940s births
Place of death missing
2020 deaths
Hindi film producers
Indian television producers